was a daimyō during the Sengoku period of Japan. He was the nephew and retainer of Toyotomi Hideyoshi, the unifier and ruler of Japan from 1590 to 1598. Despite being Hideyoshi's closest adult, male relative, Hidetsugu was accused of atrocities and attempting to stage a coup after the birth of Hideyoshi's son, and he was ordered to commit suicide. Hidetsugu's entire family, including children, were also executed on Hideyoshi's orders. His death and that of his family contributed to the quick dissolution of Toyotomi authority after Hideyoshi's death three years later.

Biography

Hidetsugu was born to Tomo (Hideyoshi's elder sister) with Miyoshi Kazumichi and later adopted by Miyoshi Yoshifusa, his name was Miyoshi Nobuyoshi. He later renamed himself Hashiba Hidetsugu, in honor of his famous uncle: "Hashiba" was the Hideyoshi's family name, and "Hidetsugu" can be translated as "next Hide".

After the Incident at Honnō-ji in 1582, Hidetsugu was given a 400 thousand koku fiefdom in Ōmi Province because he was one of Hideyoshi's few relatives. In his subsequent career as a general, during Battle of Shizugatake 1583, he held Oiwayama-fort (Oiwayama-toride, 大岩山砦) with Takayama Ukon and Nakagawa Kiyohide and he sustained heavy losses in the Battle of Nagakute 1584 against Tokugawa Ieyasu.

He proved himself in Hideyoshi's Invasion of Shikoku and Siege of Odawara. He also proved a competent manager of the castle town of Ōmihachiman.

A practitioner of the shudō tradition, Hidetsugu had a number of wakashū. Among these were Yamamoto Tonoma, Yamada Sanjuro, and his most beloved, Fuwa Bansaku (also Mansaku), who gained lasting renown for his beauty of body and spirit.

In 1590, (Tenshō 18), he was appointed castellan of Kiyosu Castle in Owari Province, where Oda Nobukatsu had once ruled. The following year, Hideyoshi lost his legitimate heir Tsurumatsu (who died before adulthood) and so gave Hidetsugu the position of Imperial Regent. This meant Hidetsugu had to move to Jurakudai in Kyoto, and resulted in a so-called "dual system of government" (二元政治) run by Hideyoshi and Hidetsugu, with the assumption that latter would succeed the former after his death. As Hideyoshi was busy handling the invasion of Korea, Hidetsugu acted in his place to handle domestic affairs.

However, in 1593, Hideyoshi's concubine, Yodo-dono, gave a birth to a new heir, Hideyori, and the relationship between Hidetsugu and Hideyoshi began to deteriorate. Rumours spread of Hidetsugu committing repeated and unjust murder, earning him the nickname "life-killing kanpaku" (殺生関白; sesshō-kanpaku) – although modern historians doubt that these rumours were accurate.

Finally, in 1595, Hidetsugu was accused of plotting a coup and ordered to commit ritual suicide at Mt. Koya. Together with him died his three wakashu, who committed suicide with his assistance.

Daimyō associated with him were confined and the Jurakudai was destroyed. Controversially, Hideyoshi ordered the execution of Hidetsugu's entire family, including children, wives and mistresses, at Sanjogawara. The harshness and brutality of executing 39 women and children shocked Japanese society and alienated many daimyō from Toyotomi rule. Combined with the fact that Hidetsugu was the last adult member of the Toyotomi clan besides Hideyoshi himself, the whole incident is often seen to be one of the key causes of the Toyotomis downfall. In a particularly tragic case, Hideyoshi refused to spare the life of Mogami Yoshiaki's 15-year-old daughter, who had only just arrived in Kyoto to become Hidetsugu's concubine and had not yet even met her husband-to-be. Her death caused the powerful Mogami clan to zealously support Tokugawa Ieyasu in the Battle of Sekigahara against Toyotomi loyalist forces, five years later.

Only two daughters of Hidetsugu's children were spared: Kikuhime, one month old, who was adopted by her grandfather's nephew, Gotō Noriyoshi and Ryūsei-in who became Sanada Yukimura's concubine.

Family
 Father: Miyoshi Kazumichi (1534–1612)
 Mother: Tomo (1534–1625)
 Siblings:
 Toyotomi Hidekatsu (1569–1592)
 Toyotomi Hideyasu (1579–1595)
 Wives, Concubines, and children:
 Wife: Ikeda Tsuneoki's daughter, called "Waka Mandokoro"
 Wife: Ichi no Dai (1562–1595), daughter of Imadegawa Harusue
 Daughter: Ryūsei-in (d.1633), Sanada Yukimura's concubine
 Concubine: Kogami-dono (d.1595), daughter of Shijo Takamasa
 Concubine: Ako no Kata (d.1595), daughter of Hibino Kiyozane
 First son: Toyotomi Senchiyomaru (1590–1595)
 Concubine: Otatsu no Kata (d.1595), daughter of Yamaguchi Shigekatsu
 Second son: Toyotomi Hyakumaru (1592–1595)
 Concubine: Sachiko (d.1595), daughter of Kitano Shobai-in
 Third son: Toyotomi Jumaru (1593–1595)
 Concubine: Ocho no Kata (d.1595), daughter of Takenaka Shigesada
 Fourth son: Toyotomi Tsuchimaru (1595–1595)
 Concubine: Okame no Mae (d.1595), daughter of Goshoji Zenjo
 First daughter: Rogetsu-in (1587–1595)
 Concubine: Kyoku-dono (d.1595), daughter of Itsuki Takashige
 Third daughter: Kikuhime (1595–1615)

References

External links

1568 births
1595 deaths
Daimyo
Suicides by seppuku
Sesshō and Kampaku
Toyotomi clan
People of Muromachi-period Japan
People of Azuchi–Momoyama-period Japan
16th-century LGBT people
People from Aichi Prefecture